Jehan Jaymon (born 16 January 1971) is a Sri Lankan former cricketer. He played in 53 first-class matches between 1989/90 and 1996/97, scoring more than 2,000 runs, including a double century.

References

External links
 

1971 births
Living people
Sri Lankan cricketers
Burgher Recreation Club cricketers
Colombo Cricket Club cricketers
Kurunegala Youth Cricket Club cricketers
Place of birth missing (living people)